The FAI World Grand Prix 2012–2013 is the fifth gliding Grand Prix. The 7 qualifying races took place during 2012–2013 worldwide flying season. The Finals were held at Vaumeilh near Sisteron, France, between 9–16 May 2014.

Summary

Finals result

* – competition number

Qualifying races

See also
Results of Grand Prix series
World Gliding Championships
European Gliding Championships

External links
https://archive.today/20140122191656/http://www.sgp.aero/event-calendar-container/2012-2013-series.aspx
http://www.fai.org/igc-news/37911-zar-event-completes-5th-grand-prix-series

Gliding competitions
Gliding in France
2012 in air sports
2013 in air sports
2012 in French sport
2013 in French sport
International sports competitions hosted by France
Aviation history of France